Tripadi (Kannada, lit. tri: three, pad or "adi": feet) is a native metre in the Kannada language dating back to c. 700 CE.

Definition

The tripadi consists of three lines, each differing from the others in the number of feet and moras (Sanskrit matras), but in accordance with the following rules:
 
The first line has 4 feet, each with 5 moras, and a caesura at the end of the second foot.  
The 6th and 10th feet of the tripadi are each required to have the metrical pattern of a Brahma foot:

The remaining feet have either 5 moras or 4, chosen to satisfy the rules of Nagavarma II:

Line 1 20 moras in four feet 
Line 2 17 moras in four feet 
Line 3 13 moras in three feet.

There is alliteration of the second letter of each line.

Metrical structure

(Here  * denotes a caesura)

 (Line 1: 20 moras in 4 feet)

 (Line 2: 17 moras in 4 feet)

 (Line 3: 13 moras in 3 feet)

Another example  is:

 (Line 1: 20 moras in 4 feet)

 (Line 2: 17 moras in 4 feet)

 (Line 3: 13 moras in 3 feet)

Example

A well-known example of the tripadi is the third stanza in the inscription of Kappe Arabhatta (here the symbol | denotes the end of a line, and ||, the end of the tripadi):  

The literal translation of the tripadi is:

See also
Kannada language
Kannada literature
Kannada meter (poetry)

Notes

References

Kannada literature
Kannada grammar
Literature of Karnataka